Mooga Nomu is a 1969 Indian Telugu-language drama film, produced M. Murugan, M. Saravanan and M. Kumaran of AVM Productions and directed by D. Yoganand. The film stars Akkineni Nageswara Rao and Jamuna, with music composed by R. Govardhanam. It is a remake of the studio's Tamil film Kalathur Kannamma (1960). The film was released on 13 February 1969.

Plot 
Venu is the son of Rao Bahadur Raja Veera Venkata Satyanarayana Gopalam, the zamindar of Ratnagiri. Gauri is the daughter of Somaiah, a peasant. They fall in love and secretly get married in a temple. Venu then leaves abroad for higher studies. The zamindar finds out about the secret marriage and is miffed at this unequal union. He compels Gauri to swear that she will leave his son's life forever, but never reveal why she did so. He then sends the now pregnant Gauri and her father to another town. Gauri gives birth to a boy, but since she had married Venu secretly her father fears about what people will say about him and his daughter. So, he sends the baby to an orphanage and lies to Gauri that the baby was stillborn. When Venu returns he seeks Gauri, but he is crestfallen when people say she was an immoral woman who had cheated on him. He becomes an alcoholic and drifts from place to place.

Meanwhile, Venu and Gauri's son Gopi has been growing up in the orphanage. Gauri, who has become a school teacher, meets him at the school where he is a student and she feels deep affection for this intelligent child. Venu visits the orphanage at the behest of Sowkar Subbaiah, a rich merchant who wants to marry off his daughter Rajani to him. Venu meets Gopi there and he also feels a deep affection for him. While attending Gopi's school drama, Venu spots Gauri and is enraged by her presence. He asks the school to dismiss her because of her alleged dubious past. Venu takes Gopi home. He stops drinking at his behest and also decides to marry Rajani so that Gopi can have a mother.

Gauri's father becomes very ill. So, he confesses that her son was not stillborn and that Gopi is that child. Gauri cannot find him when she seeks him at the orphanage. They bump into each other at the temple. She tells him that she is his mother, but when he tells her that he is living with Venu who is getting married shortly, she asks him to keep the truth a secret from Venu. Gopi tells Rajani that he knows that Venu is his father which creates a commotion in the village. Hearing the news, Gauri's father rushes to Venu's house to reclaim his grandson. Gauri follows her father to the house, but is spotted by Venu who angrily confronts her. He berates her for her alleged affairs while he was gone, but she remains silent due to the vow she had made to Venu's father. Seeing her resolve, Venu's father eventually breaks down and admits the truth. Finally, Gopi is united with his parents as they reconcile.

Cast 
Akkineni Nageswara Rao as Venu
Jamuna as Gauri
S. V. Ranga Rao as Rao Bahadur Raja Veera Venkata Satyanarayana Gopal
V. Nagayya as Somaiah
Rajanala as Subbaiah
Padmanabham as Ranganna
Vijaya Lalitha as Rambha
Geetanjali as Manga
Vennira Aadai Nirmala as Rajani
Master Brahmaji as Gopi

Soundtrack 
Music composed by R. Govardhanam.

References

External links 

1960s Telugu-language films
Indian drama films
Telugu remakes of Tamil films
AVM Productions films
Films directed by D. Yoganand